Gajendra Singh (born 10 September 1988) is an Indian first-class cricketer who plays for Rajasthan. He made his first-class debut for Rajasthan in the 2007–08 Ranji Trophy on 17 December 2007.

References

External links
 

1988 births
Living people
Indian cricketers
Rajasthan cricketers